Farquhar Glacier, is a glacier in northwestern Greenland. Administratively it belongs to the Avannaata municipality.

This glacier was named by Robert Peary after Commodore Farquhar (1840 – 1907), Chief of the Bureau of Yards and Docks.

Geography 
The Farquhar Glacier discharges from the Greenland Ice Sheet into the northern side of the head of the Inglefield Fjord just northeast of Josephine Peary Island. Its terminus lies between two nunataks: Mount Lee in the east separates it from the Tracy Glacier to the southeast and Mount Field, a larger nunatak to the west, separates it from the Melville Glacier to the northwest. 

Formerly the roughly NE/SW flowing Farquhar Glacier joined with the east/west flowing Tracy Glacier at their terminus. However, these two glaciers lost contact after the terminus disintegrated in 2002.

See also
List of glaciers in Greenland
Inglefield Fjord
Glacier terminus

References

External links
Ice front and flow speed variations of marine-terminating outlet glaciers along the coast of Prudhoe Land, northwestern Greenland
Identifying Spatial Variability in Greenland's Outlet Glacier Response to Ocean Heat
The recent regimen of the ice cap margin in North Greenland
Glaciers of Greenland